Plateau potentials, caused by persistent inward currents (PICs), are a type of electrical behavior seen in neurons.

Spinal Cord 
Plateau potentials are of particular importance to spinal cord motor systems. PICs are set up by the influence of descending monoaminergic reticulospinal pathways. Metabotropic neurotransmitters, via monoaminergic input such as 5-HT and norepinephrine, modulate the activity of dendritic L-type Calcium channels that allow a sustained, positive, inward current into the cell. This leads to a  lasting depolarisation. In this state, the cell fires action potentials independent of synaptic input. The PICs can be turned off via the activation of high-frequency inhibitory input at which point the cell returns to a resting state.

Olfactory Bulb 
Periglomerular cells, inhibitory interneurons that surround and innervate olfactory glomeruli, have also been shown to exhibit plateau potentials.

Cortex and Hippocampus 
Plateau potentials are also seen in the cortical, and hippocampal pyramidal neurons. Using iontophoretic, or two-photon glutamate uncaging experiments, it has been discovered that these plateau potentials include activities of voltage dependent calcium channels and NMDA receptors.

References 

Electrophysiology
Action potentials